Rolleville is a commune in the Seine-Maritime department in the Normandy region in northern France.

Geography
SNCF has a TER railway station here.

Heraldry

Population

Places of interest
 The nineteenth-century church of St. Hilaire.
 A sixteenth-century manorhouse.

See also
Communes of the Seine-Maritime department

References

External links

An unofficial website about Rolleville 

Communes of Seine-Maritime